Petrovići may refer to:

 Petrovići, Istočno Novo Sarajevo, a village in Bosnia and Herzegovina
 Petrovići, Trebinje, a village in Bosnia and Herzegovina
 Petrovići, Croatia, a village near Vrbovsko, Croatia
 Petrovići, Nikšić, a village in Montenegro
 Donji Petrovići, a village in Bosnia and Herzegovina
 Gornji Petrovići, a village in Bosnia and Herzegovina
 Petrovići, Olovo, a village in Bosnia and Herzegovina
 Petrović-Njegoš dynasty or Petrovići, the Serbian family that ruled Montenegro from 1697 to 1916

See also
 Petrovici, surname (including a list of people with the name)
 Petrović, surname (including a list of people with the name)